Sudipto Banerjee (born October 23, 1972) is an Indian-American statistician best known for his work on Bayesian hierarchical modeling and inference for spatial data analysis. He is Professor and Chair of the Department of Biostatistics in the School of Public Health at the University of California, Los Angeles. He served as the 2022 President of the International Society for Bayesian Analysis.

Early life and education
Banerjee was born in Kolkata, India. He attended Presidency College, Kolkata for his undergraduate studies, and the Indian Statistical Institute, graduating with an M.STAT in 1996. Subsequently, he moved to the United States and obtained an MS and PhD in Statistics from the University of Connecticut in 2000, where he was introduced to Bayesian statistics and hierarchical modeling by Alan Enoch Gelfand who had been instrumental in the development of the Gibbs sampler and Markov chain Monte Carlo algorithms in Bayesian statistics.

Career
Banerjee joined the University of Minnesota, Twin Cities in 2000 as an Assistant Professor of Biostatistics and was associated with the School of Public Health for 14 years. There he worked on a number of problems and wrote numerous articles on spatial statistics, developing theory and methods related to Bayesian modeling and inference for geographic data with wide-ranging applications in public and environmental health sciences, ecology, forestry, real estate economics and agronomy.  In 2014, Banerjee joined the Department of Biostatistics in the School of Public Health at UCLA as Professor and Chair of Biostatistics.

Awards and honors
Banerjee has received many honors, including the Abdel El-Shaarawi Award from The International Environmetric Society (TIES), the Mortimer Spiegelman Award from the American Public Health Association and the George W. Snedecor Award from the Committee of Presidents of Statistical Societies (COPSS), elected membership of the International Statistical Institute, elected fellowships in the Institute of Mathematical Statistics (IMS), the American Statistical Association (ASA), the International Society for Bayesian Analysis and the American Association for the Advancement of Science (AAAS), a Distinguished Achievement Medal from the ASA's Section on Statistics and the Environment, and the ASA's Outstanding Statistical Application Award.

Selected works

References

Don Bosco schools alumni
Indian Statistical Institute alumni
University of Calcutta alumni
Indian statisticians
Biostatisticians
University of Connecticut alumni
Living people
UCLA School of Public Health faculty
1972 births
20th-century Indian mathematicians
Elected Members of the International Statistical Institute
Fellows of the American Statistical Association
Fellows of the Institute of Mathematical Statistics
Fellows of the American Association for the Advancement of Science
Scientists from Kolkata
Mathematical statisticians
Spatial statisticians